West Point Historic District may refer to:

West Point Historic District (West Point, Kentucky), listed on the National Register of Historic Places in Hardin County, Kentucky
West Point Historic District (West Point, Virginia), listed on the National Register of Historic Places in King William County, Virginia